Claude Dehombreux (14 October 1939 – 31 December 2010) was the best Belgian rower of the 1960s–1970s, winning 30 national titles in skiff events. He competed at the 1968, 1972 and 1976 Summer Olympics in single, double and single sculls, respectively, with the best result of ninth place in 1972. After retiring from competitions he worked as a rowing coach.

References 

1939 births
2010 deaths
Belgian male rowers
Rowers at the 1968 Summer Olympics
Rowers at the 1972 Summer Olympics
Rowers at the 1976 Summer Olympics
People from Ixelles
Olympic rowers of Belgium
Sportspeople from Brussels
20th-century Belgian people